The 2016–17 Egyptian Second Division (also known as dmc League for sponsorship reasons) was the 37th edition of the Egyptian Second Division, the top Egyptian semi-professional level for football clubs, since its establishment in 1977. The season began on 17 October 2016 and concluded on 21 May 2017. Fixtures for the 2016–17 season were announced on 26 September 2016.

On 6 April 2017, Al Assiouty Sport were the first team to secure the promotion to the 2017–18 Egyptian Premier League from Group A, after defeating Beni Suef 2–1.

On 28 April 2017, Al Nasr were officially promoted from Group B, after FC Masr, the second placed team, failed to defeat El Qanah as the match ended 0–0.

On 5 May 2017, the last day of Group C matches, El Raja managed to defeat Baladeyet El Mahalla 1–0 with a goal in the 95th minute in a dramatic match and secured the promotion to the Egyptian Premier League; had Baladeyet El Mahalla won or drawn, they would have promoted instead.

Teams
A total of fifty-four teams competed in the league, including forty-two sides from the 2015–16 season, three relegated from the 2015–16 Egyptian Premier League and nine promoted from the 2015–16 Egyptian Third Division.

Stadia and locations
Note: Table lists in alphabetical order.

Group A

Group B

Group C

Results

League tables

Group A

Group B

Group C

Results tables

Group A

Group B

Group C

References

Egyptian Second Division seasons
Egy
Egy
Second Division